Diourbel Department is one of the 45 departments of Senegal, one of the three constituting the Diourbel Region.

There is one commune in the department, which is Diourbel.

The rural districts (communautés rurales) are:

 Ndindy Arrondissement
 Ndankh Sene
 Gade Escale
 Keur Ngalgou
 N'Dindy
 Taïba Moutoupha
 Touba Lappe
 Ndoulo Arrondissement
 N'Doulo
 N'Gohe
 Patar
 Tocky-Gare
 Toure M'Bonde

Historic sites 
 Grand Mosque of Diourbel 
 Prefecture
 Railway station
 Building housing the Post Office
 Battlefield of Bounghoye
 Battlefield of Ndiaby
 Ibrahima Thioye school, Diourbel town
 Baobab tree called "Gouye Sambaye Karang" in Keur Yéli Manel Fall Quarter, Diourbel town
 Baobab tree called "Gouye Woté" in Ndiodione Quarter, Diourbel
 Residence of Cheikh Ahmadou Bamba, Diourbel town
 Battlefield of Sambé
 Battlefield of Ngagnane, administrative centre of Diourbel
 Sereer tombs at Ndayane and associated remains

References

Departments of Senegal
Diourbel Region